David Raine (born 28 March 1937) is an English former footballer who played as a full-back for Port Vale, Doncaster Rovers, Colchester United, and Burton Albion. He made 299 league appearances in a ten-year career in the English Football League, won the Fourth Division title with Port Vale in 1958–59, and was also promoted out of the Fourth Division with Colchester United in 1965–66.

Career
Raine graduated through the Port Vale juniors to make his debut at Vale Park in a 2–1 win over Rotherham United on 27 April 1957. He signed his first professional contract the following month, at the end of the 1956–57 season, after the "Valiants" were relegated out of the Second Division. He established himself in Norman Low's first team in the 1957–58 season, featuring in 31 Third Division South and three FA Cup games. He played in every game from November 1958 to the close of the 1958–59 season, as Vale won the Fourth Division title. He made 47 appearances in the 1959–60 season, and scored his first senior goal on 5 December, in a 3–3 draw with Queens Park Rangers in an FA Cup Second Round match at Loftus Road. He played 46 league and cup appearances in the 1960–61 campaign, missing just eight Third Division games. However, he then fell out of favour at Vale Park, and played just seven league and five FA Cup games in the 1961–62 season.

Raine was sold to Oscar Hold's Doncaster Rovers for a £2,000 fee in July 1962. Fourth Division "Donny" finished 16th in 1962–63 and 14th in 1963–64, before new boss Bill Leivers took them up to ninth place in 1964–65. In his three seasons at Belle Vue, Raine scored two goals in 126 league and cup appearances. He joined Neil Franklin's Colchester United on a free transfer in June 1965. He played 25 league and cup games in the 1965–66 season, as the "U's" won promotion out of the Fourth Division. He featured 27 times in the 1966–67 campaign, before leaving Layer Road on a free transfer to Southern League club Burton Albion in April 1967.

Career statistics
Source:

Honours
Port Vale
Football League Fourth Division: 1958–59

Colchester United
Football League Fourth Division fourth-place promotion: 1965–66

References

1957 births
Living people
Footballers from Darlington
English footballers
Association football fullbacks
Port Vale F.C. players
Doncaster Rovers F.C. players
Colchester United F.C. players
Burton Albion F.C. players
English Football League players
Southern Football League players